The term aritox occurs in names of monoclonal antibodies and indicates that they are linked to an A chain of the ricin protein.

Telimomab aritox
Zolimomab aritox

Toxins